is a Japanese rugby union player who plays as a back row forward.

In his home country he plays for the NEC Green Rockets whom he joined in 2011.   He was also named in the first ever  squad which will compete in Super Rugby from the 2016 season.   Murata is a Japanese international who debuted against South Korea in 2015, but did not make the squad for the 2015 Rugby World Cup.

References

1988 births
Living people
Japanese rugby union players
Japan international rugby union players
Rugby union flankers
Green Rockets Tokatsu players
People from Tokyo
Hino Red Dolphins players
Sunwolves players
Hanazono Kintetsu Liners players